Felix Wagner (born 21 October 1965) is a Swiss wheelchair curler.

He participated in the 2018 Winter Paralympics where Swiss team finished on sixth place.

Teams

References

External links 

Felix Wagner - Swiss Paralympic
Felix WAGNER - Athlete Profile - World Para Nordic Skiing - Live results | International Paralympic Committee
Paralympics: «Felix der Glückliche» will es wissen | zueriost

 Video: 

Living people
1965 births
Swiss male curlers
Swiss wheelchair curlers
Paralympic wheelchair curlers of Switzerland
Wheelchair curlers at the 2018 Winter Paralympics
Swiss wheelchair curling champions